Ben Bowns (born 21 January 1991) is a professional British ice hockey goaltender for UK Elite Ice Hockey League side Cardiff Devils and the Great Britain national team.

Playing career
Bowns played youth hockey in Sheffield, before signing with the Hull Stingrays in 2012. He would play two years as the starter in Hull before signing in Cardiff in 2014.

With the Devils, he won the EIHL Challenge Cup twice and has been named goaltender of the year three times. Despite receiving offers from other European leagues, remained in Cardiff until 2020.

On 14 August 2020 it was confirmed Bowns had departed Cardiff for IceHL side Graz 99ers. Bowns had played against Graz twice in the 2019–20 Champions Hockey League, helping Cardiff to two wins over the 99ers.

In March 2021, Bowns was drafted by EIHL side Nottingham Panthers ahead of the 2021 Elite Series.

On 16 June 2021 it was announced Bowns had signed to a second contract abroad after agreeing to join Slovak Extraliga side HK Dukla Trenčín for the 2021–22 season.

After two seasons abroad, Bowns returned to the UK and to a second spell with Cardiff – re-signing in May 2022 ahead of the 2022–23 season.

In February 2023, Bowns was credited with a goal in Cardiff's 4–1 victory at the Dundee Stars, as he was the last Devils player to touch the puck prior to the Stars' Johan Eriksson putting it into his own net. As a result, he became the fourth goaltender to be credited with such an achievement in British league ice hockey, after Tony Melia, Jody Lehman and Mark Bernard.

International play
Bowns made his first appearance for the British senior team in 2012, and has played as the country's starter ever since. In 2019, Britain made the IIHF Men's World Championship for the first time in 25 years, where Bowns was named player of the match after making 59 saves in a 6-3 loss to the USA. He finished the tournament as the goalie with the most saves. Bowns again represented Great Britain at the 2021 IIHF World Championship, finishing with a save percentage of 91%.

Personal life 

Bowns has named former NHL goalie Patrick Roy as his favourite player growing up.

References

External links

1991 births
Living people
Cardiff Devils players
Graz 99ers players
HK Dukla Trenčín players
Hull Stingrays players
Nottingham Panthers players
English ice hockey goaltenders
British expatriate ice hockey people
English expatriate sportspeople in Slovakia
English expatriate sportspeople in Austria
Expatriate ice hockey players in Slovakia
Expatriate ice hockey players in Austria
Sportspeople from Rotherham